La Ronde is a Canadian short drama film, directed by Sophie Goyette and released in 2011. The film stars Éliane Préfontaine and Hubert Lemire as Ariane and Alexandre, twin siblings who are experiencing very different reactions to their father's impending death: Alexandre feels the need to stay close to their father, while Ariane feels the need to leave.

The film premiered at the Locarno Film Festival on August 6, 2011, and had its Canadian premiere at the 2011 Toronto International Film Festival.

The film was named to TIFF's year-end Canada's Top Ten list for 2011, and was a Genie Award nominee for Best Live Action Short Drama at the 32nd Genie Awards.

Goyette's feature film debut, Still Night, Still Light (Mes nuits feront écho), starred Préfontaine in a thematically similar story about a different character.

References

External links
 
 

2011 short films
2011 films
Films directed by Sophie Goyette
French-language Canadian films
Canadian drama short films
2010s Canadian films